is the 5th single by the Japanese idol girl group Onyanko Club. It was released in Japan on July 21, 1986.

Outline 
This song marked the first time that Yukiko Iwai became one of the lead vocalists.

This would also be the second instance of Kazuko Utsumi singing a B side, as she did with Omoide Bijin on the single Otto CHIKAN!

Track listing

Charts

Weekly charts

Year-end charts

References 

Onyanko Club songs
1986 songs
1986 singles
Songs with lyrics by Yasushi Akimoto
Pony Canyon singles
Oricon Weekly number-one singles
Songs written by Tsugutoshi Gotō